Martin Yeates (born 24 November 1953 in Salisbury, England) is a former motorcycle speedway rider who most prominently rode for the Poole Pirates, Weymouth Wildcats and Oxford Cheetahs.

He twice won the National League Pairs Championship, in 1982 with Simon Wigg and in 1983 with Simon Cross. In 1982 he was the National League Pairs winner with Simon Wigg.
He also reached the Overseas Final round of the Speedway World Championship in 1984, becoming the first National League rider to reach that stage.
Retiring at the end of the 1987 season, he set up his own business - Martin Yeates Caravans - just outside Salisbury, later renamed as Salisbury Caravan Centre.
His involvement with Speedway continued with association with Swindon Robins as Team Manager and Co-Promoter.

References 

1953 births
Living people
British speedway riders
English motorcycle racers
Stoke Potters riders
Eastbourne Eagles riders
Oxford Cheetahs riders
Poole Pirates riders
Reading Racers riders
Swindon Robins riders
Weymouth Wildcats riders
Sportspeople from Salisbury